Igor Vasilyevich Bulanov (born 15 November 1963) is a former Russian professional footballer.

Playing career
He made his professional debut in the Soviet Second League in 1980 for FC Baltika Kaliningrad.

Honours
 Soviet Top League runner-up: 1986
 Soviet Cup winner: 1984
 Soviet Cup finalist: 1990

European club competitions
FC Dynamo Moscow
 European Cup Winners' Cup 1984–85: 6 games, 2 goals
 UEFA Cup 1987–88: 4 games

References

1963 births
People from Korolyov, Moscow Oblast
Living people
Soviet footballers
Russian footballers
Russian expatriate footballers
FC Baltika Kaliningrad players
FC Dynamo Moscow players
FC Lokomotiv Moscow players
VfL Osnabrück players
Soviet Top League players
Russian Premier League players
2. Bundesliga players
Association football defenders
FC Dinamo Minsk players
Sportspeople from Moscow Oblast